José Belda Mira (born 6 June 1975) is a Spanish former amateur road racing cyclist.

Career
Hailing from Ontinyent, in the Province of Valencia, Belda started cycling at the age of 26, later than most. He made his competition debut in the highest amateur level in Spain at 30 years old. In 2006, he celebrated his first victory at this level, winning the second stage of the Vuelta a Galicia.

In 2007, Belda was unable to compete in the GP Macario due to having a hematocrit level above 50%. A few months later, he won his first Vuelta a Tenerife. In 2008, Belda celebrated several more victories, including the Quebrantahuesos, one of the most well-known and difficult amateur races in the country.

From 2009 to 2011, Belda was the best amateur cyclist in Spain. Victorious on numerous occasions, he was particularly famous during the 2011 season by winning 30 races, including many of the stage races on the Spanish amateur calendar (Volta ás Comarcas de Lugo, Vuelta a Castellón, Vuelta a Tenerife, Tour of the Province of Valencia, Vuelta a Galicia, Vuelta a Cantabria).

In 2012, Belda's success continued. In May, he stood out among professionals, when he finished third in the queen stage and fourth overall in the Vuelta a la Comunidad de Madrid, a UCI Europe Tour 2.1 event, while riding with the Spanish national team. However, the UCI announces that they have received two positive anti-doping tests from Belda, for methyltestosterone and ritalinic acid, both in races Belda won. After these tests, Belda served a two-year suspension, ultimately ending his career.

Major results

2006
 1st Stage 2 Vuelta a Galicia
2007
 1st  Overall Vuelta a Tenerife
1st Stage 2
2008
 2nd Overall Vuelta a Tenerife
1st Stages 4 & 5a
2009
 1st  Time trial, National Amateur Road Championships
 1st  Overall Vuelta a Tenerife
1st Stages 1, 3 & 5a
 1st Stage 4 Circuito Montañés
 1st Gran Premio Primavera de Ontur
 5th Overall Cinturón a Mallorca
2010
 1st  Overall Vuelta a Tenerife
1st Stages 2, 4 & 5a
 1st Stage 1 Vuelta a Cantabria
 2nd Time trial, National Amateur Road Championships
 10th Overall Cinturó de l'Empordà
2011
 1st  Time trial, National Amateur Road Championships
 1st Gran Premio Primavera de Ontur
 1st Trofeo Olías Industrial
 1st Prueba Loinaz
 1st Ronda al Maestrazgo
 1st  Overall Vuelta a Tenerife
1st Stages 1, 3, 4 & 5
 1st  Overall Vuelta a Castellón
1st Stages 1, 2 & 4
 1st  Overall Volta ás Comarcas de Lugo
 1st  Overall Tour of the Province of Valencia
1st Stages 1 & 4
 1st  Overall Vuelta a Galicia
1st Stage 1
 1st  Overall Vuelta a Cantabria
1st Stage 1
 6th Overall Vuelta Ciclista a León
 6th Overall Cinturón a Mallorca
1st Stage 1
2012

1st  Overall Vuelta Ciclista a León
1st Stage 2

 1st Trofeo Olías Industrial
 1st  Overall Vuelta a Tenerife
1st Stage 1b
 2nd Volta ao Ribeiro
 2nd Overall Vuelta a Ávila
 3rd Overall Vuelta a Castellón
1st Stage 3
 4th Overall Vuelta a la Comunidad de Madrid

References

1975 births
Living people
Spanish male cyclists
People from Vall d'Albaida
Sportspeople from the Province of Valencia
Cyclists from the Valencian Community